Christina Lydia Desiderio (born August 22, 2000, in New Jersey) is a retired American artistic gymnast. Desiderio was named to the 2015 U.S. Junior National team, after her performances at the 2015 U.S. National Gymnastics Championships.

Personal life 
Christina Lydia Desiderio was born on August 22, 2000, in New Jersey to parents Dominick and Carol (née Noll) Desiderio. She has an older brother, Dominick, who is 2 years older than her, and is a baseball player. She graduated high school a year early. She lives in Hackettstown and commutes over an hour each day to train at Parkettes National Gymnastics Training Center in Allentown.

Desiderio started the sport at Giant Gymnastics in Hackettstown and trained at the club until 2010.

Gymnastics career

2012-15: Level 10 and Junior International Elite career 
Desiderio moved up to Level 10 for the 2012 season. Throughout the season, she placed second in the all-around at States, as well as winning three individual titles. Later, at Regionals, Christina tied for sixth in the all-around and was the beam and vault champion. She advanced to J.O.Nationals and was fifty-fourth in the Junior A division. In 2013, Desiderio competed at States only; winning the vault and floor titles as well as finishing fourth in the all-around. In June, she participated in a National Elite Qualifier and achieved Junior International Elite status. She competed at the American Classic at the Karolyi Ranch and was eighth overall. At the U.S. Classic, Christina finished tenth in the all-around. She competed at Nationals; finishing thirteenth in the all-around.

Desiderio competed as an elite throughout the whole 2014 season. She requalified to elite status at the 2014 National Elite Qualifier in San Diego; despite already being qualified. At the 2014 U.S. Classic, she placed eighth in the all-around. She was eighteenth in the all-around at Nationals, after a tough competition. Christina started the 2015 season at the U.S. Classic, where she placed tenth in the all-around and was second on floor.

On October 7, 2015, she announced her verbal commitment to the LSU Lady Tigers gymnastics program – starting from the 2018–19 academic year.

2016: Senior International Elite career 
In 2016 Christina was named to the National Team and invited to compete for a place on the Olympic Team at the 2016 Olympic Trials.

2017–present: Collegiate career 
Desiderio graduated from high school a year early as a homeschooler to begin attending Louisiana State University and the LSU Lady Tigers gymnastics team.

References 

2000 births
Living people
American female artistic gymnasts
American children
People from Hackettstown, New Jersey
People from Independence Township, New Jersey
Sportspeople from Warren County, New Jersey
Place of birth missing (living people)
U.S. women's national team gymnasts
LSU Tigers women's gymnasts